Epipogium aphyllum, the ghost orchid (not to be confused with the American ghost orchid, Dendrophylax lindenii) is a hardy myco-heterotrophic orchid lacking chlorophyll.

It is famous for its unpredictable appearance; in many localities it has been seen just once. It is found in beech, oak, pine and spruce forests on base-rich soils. It is a rare and critically endangered plant in habitat, and is believed to be extinct throughout much of its former range, although it has been recently confirmed in the United Kingdom (2009), an area where the plants were believed to have gone extinct.

The plants are protected in many locales, and removing the plants from habitat or disturbing the plants, even for scientific study, can be a very serious matter in many jurisdictions. These plants are exceptionally rare and should never be removed from habitat or disturbed.

In 1926 the Welsh botanist Eleanor Vachell was asked by the British Museum to investigate a report of the ghost orchid in England. For many years the Welsh National Herbarium at Amgueddfa Cymru (National Museum of Wales) had only a small rhizome that had been gathered by Vachell on 29 May 1926.

Biology

Once thought to be saprophytic, these hardy plants are actually obligate mycoheterotrophs (or epiparasites) that obtain nutrients from mycorrhizal networks involving basidiomycete fungi that are in turn associated with the roots of various species of coniferous trees. They grow from an underground, burrowing stem which lacks chlorophyll and possesses ephemeral leaves that are small scales. The plants only emerge above ground to flower, especially during very wet summers in Western Europe.

The plants have an extremely wide range of distribution. The species is widespread across much of Europe and northern Asia from Spain to Kamchatka and south the Himalayas. It is, however, exceptionally rare in habitat. The plants are all found in areas which typically experience cold winters. The plant's rhizomes are densely colonized by fungi bearing clamp-connections and dolipores, all basidiomycetes, gill or pore-forming mushroom species that are normally found growing in mycorrhizal association with the roots of coniferous trees.

These plants harness an array of fungal symbionts across several families, often simultaneously.  Analysis of these plants have identified Inocybe species as exclusive symbionts for 75% of the plants in habitat, as well as others (Hebeloma, Xerocomus, Lactarius and Thelephora). The plants also host ascomycete endophytes, which appear to assist the plant in parasitizing some of the plant's basidiomycete symbionts.

The plants defy cultivation outside of laboratory conditions, as they require not only specific fungal symbionts, but also specific host trees with which these mushroom species form mycorrhizal relationships. Large plants of this species can produce a rather stunning woodland display with up to a dozen flower stalks at once bearing 3–4 flowers each growing out of coniferous leaf litter.

Chromosome number is often stated as 2n = 68, though one research article questions whether this value could be for a different Epipogium species.

References

External links
 
 
 Den virtuella floran - Distribution
 ORCHIDS of EUROPE & THE MEDITERRANEAN - Ulster Museum
 Britain's Orchids

Epipogiinae
Plants described in 1753
Taxa named by Olof Swartz
Myco-heterotrophic orchids
Flora of the United Kingdom
Orchids of Europe
Orchids of Asia